Gowlak may refer to:
 Gowlak, Gilan
 Gowlak, West Azerbaijan